The 1924 United States presidential election was the 35th quadrennial presidential election, held on Tuesday, November 4, 1924. In a three-way contest, incumbent Republican President Calvin Coolidge won election to a full term. Coolidge was the second president to ascend to the presidency to win a full term.

Coolidge had been vice president under Warren G. Harding and became president in 1923 upon Harding's unexpected death. Coolidge was given credit for a booming economy at home and no visible crises abroad, and he faced little opposition at the 1924 Republican National Convention. The Democratic Party nominated former Congressman and ambassador to the United Kingdom John W. Davis of West Virginia. Davis, a compromise candidate, triumphed on the 103rd ballot of the 1924 Democratic National Convention after a deadlock between supporters of William Gibbs McAdoo and Al Smith. Dissatisfied by the conservatism of both major party candidates, the Progressive Party nominated Senator Robert La Follette of Wisconsin.

In a 2010 book, Garland S. Tucker argues that the election marked the "high tide of American conservatism", as both major candidates campaigned for limited government, reduced taxes, and less regulation. By contrast, La Follette called for the gradual nationalization of the railroads and increased taxes on the wealthy.

Coolidge won a landslide victory, taking majorities in both the popular vote and the Electoral College and winning almost every state outside of the Solid South. La Follette won 16.6% of the popular vote, a strong showing for a third-party candidate, while Davis won the lowest share of the popular vote of any Democratic nominee since Breckinridge in 1860, when the party split between a northern and southern ticket. This is the most recent election to date in which a third-party candidate won a non-southern state. This was also the US election with the lowest per capita voter turnout since records were kept.

Nominations

Republican Party nomination

 
Republican candidates

When Coolidge became president, he was fortunate to have had a stable cabinet that remained untarnished by the scandals of the Harding administration. He won public confidence by taking a hand in settling a serious Pennsylvania coal strike, even though much of the negotiation's success was largely due to the state's governor, Gifford Pinchot. However, the more conservative factions within the Republican Party remained unconvinced in the new president's own conservatism, given his rather liberal record while governor of Massachusetts, and he had not even been their first choice for the vice presidency back in 1920; Senator Irvine Lenroot had been the choice of the party bosses then, but the delegates had rebelled. However, Coolidge was not popular with the liberal or progressive factions within the party either. Heartened by their victories in the 1922 midterms, the party's progressives vigorously opposed a continuation of the late Harding's policies. In the fall of 1923, Senator Hiram Johnson of California announced his intention of fighting Coolidge in the presidential primaries, and already friends of Senator Robert La Follette of Wisconsin were planning a third party.

Coolidge decided to head off the immediate threat of Johnson's candidacy by gaining the endorsement of some of the liberals. He first approached Senator William Borah of Idaho and cultivated his circle by making a conciliatory reference to the Soviet Union in a speech in December. No sooner had the Soviet Union reacted favorably than Secretary of State Charles Evans Hughes persuaded the President to reject it. This left Borah on the verge of deserting Coolidge, but the subsequent disclosure of corruption among the Establishment persuaded him to stay and to try to convince Coolidge to align his policies more closely to his own. Coolidge for his part seemed unsure of what ideological posture to assume. His State of the Union address in January was neither liberal nor reactionary. He played Borah by repeatedly promising to fire Attorney General Harry Daugherty and putting it off. In a speech on Lincoln Day Coolidge promised unstinting prosecution that would not mingle the innocent and the guilty—and managed to keep Borah within his ranks until he no longer feared the senator's influence. By then, Coolidge had made himself sufficiently strong to replace not only corrupt officeholders but also many Republican stalwarts on the national committee and throughout the party hierarchy, elevating in their stead business friends loyal to him; Coolidge managed to create a conservative administration that had very little to do with the party establishment. In an effort to try to get at least some of the liberals back into the party ranks, he then offered the vice presidency to the popular Senator Borah. The senator declined, also refusing to nominate Coolidge at that year's Republican convention which he later decided against attending.

Another task for Coolidge, only slightly easier than tightening his hold over the party's divergent factions, was to rebuild the party organization. A few years before, Will Hays had brought disciplined energy to the office of Republican national chairman. Hays's replacement, William Butler, lacked his predecessor's experience, and it fell to Coolidge himself to whip the party into shape. His prime task was to establish control over the party in order to ensure his own nomination.

Through the power of patronage Coolidge consolidated his hold over Republican officeholders and office-seekers in the South, where the party was made up of little more than those whose positions were awarded through such a system. This allowed him to gain control of Southern delegates to the coming Republican convention. He also let it be known that his secretary Campbell Slemp, who favored the policy, would remove African-American Republican leaders in the South in order to attract more white voters to the party. Only California Senator Hiram Johnson challenged Coolidge in the South; Governor Frank Lowden of Illinois, potentially Coolidge's most dangerous rival for the nomination, was attending to his state after he had decided 1924 would probably be a Democratic year. When the early Alabama primary resulted in a slate contested between the Coolidge and Johnson forces, an administration-picked committee on delegates awarded Alabama to Coolidge.

Johnson formally opened his campaign for the presidential nomination in Cleveland, Ohio on January 2. He delivered a sharp attack on the Republican National Committee for increasing southern delegate representation in the national convention while also criticizing Coolidge for supplying arms to the Obregón forces in Mexico. "I shall not concede," he said "that collectors of revenue, U.S. Marshals, postmasters, and other officeholders may themselves alone nominate candidates for the Presidency." Johnson later condemned inefficient enforcement of prohibition and argued against Secretary of the Treasury Andrew Mellon's plan to reduce taxes, which he said favored the wealthiest classes.

Johnson's drive began to falter almost as soon as it had begun. In appealing to the rank and file he moved even further away from the organization Republicans who would choose the nominee. Johnson, moreover, was too much a maverick for the conciliatory role demanded of a national political candidate. In the mid-1920s the major parties had little use for the nonconformists like Johnson or Governor Gifford Pinchot of Pennsylvania, but Johnson in truth could not easily be placed in the political spectrum. He did oppose the administration's tax reduction program which favored higher income groups, but he spoke against the World Court as he had the League of Nations, opposed the sale of arms to liberal Obregón forces in Mexico, called for an end to all Chinese immigration, and joined the American Legion in calling for the immediate payment of the veterans' bonus.

To head off the Johnson threat, such as it was, Coolidge used the familiar weapons of his office. Through patronage threats he persuaded Senator James Watson of Indiana to take his own favorite-son candidacy out of the race; the decision was announced on January 11 after Watson met with William Butler, the President's campaign manager. To seal the Indiana factions in common cause, Butler made Colonel Carmi Thompson from Cleveland, Ohio associate manager for Coolidge's pre-convention campaign. On January 16 steps were taken to enter Coolidge in Johnson's own California primary. Two days after that, Coolidge received the endorsement of the anti-prohibitionist Nicholas M. Butler, president of Columbia University. A little later, Governor Pinchot, who had lost control of his state party organization, earned a place in his state's delegation, further state patronage, and other concessions in exchange for his support of the President. By the end of the month the eastern states were clearly entrenched in their support of Coolidge. In Michigan, where Johnson had won the presidential preference campaign in 1920, Coolidge backers filed nominating petitions for an old man named Hiram Johnson, hoping to divide the anti-administration vote. This Johnson, who resided in Michigan's Upper Peninsula, planned no campaign.

But the California senator remained in the race; it is thought that he might have hoped his candidacy would force Coolidge to adopt a more progressive stance, especially in regards to corruption. Johnson for example was prominent in the movement that led Coolidge to fire Attorney General Daugherty and accept the resignation of Secretary of the Navy Edwin Denby. In an effort to offset Johnson's popularity in some of the farm states the president also increased the tariff on wheat, and made available further farm loans. His efforts paid off in the first presidential primary in North Dakota; Coolidge won, La Follette ran second, and Johnson was far behind La Follette. The radical vote was split with Coolidge winning only with a plurality however, and Johnson remained in the race. Later in March, Johnson barely nosed ahead of Coolidge in the South Dakota primary, where Johnson had the personal support of the popular Senator Peter Norbeck. This would be the only primary Johnson would win. During April Coolidge defeated him in swift succession in Michigan, Illinois, Nebraska, Oklahoma, New Jersey and Ohio. Refusing to quit, Johnson allowed his campaign to limp along into early May; then Coolidge defeated Johnson even in his staunch progressive-Republican state of California, despite Coolidge's opposition to an outright ban on Chinese immigration.

In mid-May the official Coolidge headquarters opened in Cleveland, Ohio under the direction of William Butler, general manager of the Coolidge campaign. When Butler predicted that 1,066 of the 1,109 delegates would favor Coolidge, no one really doubted him, and the Republicans planned a king of outing, like the familiar business conventions, rather than a serious political encounter. The only remotely interesting event would be the choosing of a vice presidential candidate, Coolidge himself had not bothered to decide on a candidate; evidently he hoped Borah might still run but the other candidates were all acceptable to him. Circumstances affecting the two most recent occupants of that office however gave the dramatic illusion of the importance of the Vice-Presidency. When President Wilson fell ill in 1919 only a heartbeat kept the little-known Thomas R. Marshall from becoming president. Then Harding's death sent Coolidge to the White House. A man of ability had to be chosen and one who would also bring strength to the ticket in areas where La Follette could potentially run well. When Senator Borah declined the honor, California Republicans started to boost Herbert Hoover, who was credited with helping Coolidge triumph over Johnson in the state's presidential primary. Particularly since the narrow defeat of Charles E. Hughes in 1916, discovered only the day after the election when the final tallies were received from California, the state had been looked upon as important; the imminent candidacy of Robert La Follette, who would appeal to western liberals, made California all the more crucial. The New York Times thought Hoover would make an excellent choice, recognition at last that the vice president must be a man fitted for the presidency. Coolidge never spoke for Hoover and may have hoped he would remain in the cabinet where he was needed. As a dynamic vice president, Hoover would be too visibly the heir apparent for 1928; certainly he would overshadow the chief executive in an embarrassing way. Other candidates mentioned prominently included Governor Frank O. Lowden of Illinois, Governor Arthur M. Hyde of Missouri, and Charles G. Dawes, author of the German war reparations payment plan. It was hoped that both the party's candidates would be chosen on Thursday, June 12, to avoid the necessity of naming the Vice President on Friday the 13th.

The platform also came under special consideration in the weeks before the convention. Some Republican liberals threatened to support La Follette's third party ticket if the document omitted certain planks. Other problems faced the Platform Committee: the veterans' bonus, tax reform, Chinese immigration, and the World Court — all issues that cut at least one extremity from the main body of the party. Heading up the Committee on Resolutions, which was enjoined to formulate the party platform, was Charles B. Warren. In fact, however, much of the actual drafting fell to a subcommittee of the national committee, with vice-chairman Ralph Williams of Oregon as its head.

Nicholas M. Butler suggested that the platform consist of twelve to fifteen crisp sentences written by President Coolidge. It did indeed turn out to be a short and noncontroversial document. No mention was made of the Ku Klux Klan, and faint praise was given to hopeful plans for joining the World Court and helping the farmer. Apparently the party thought that traditional Republican strength in the areas affected by crop failure and low prices could accommodate a mild rebellion without loss of the section's electoral votes. The platform spoke of Coolidge's "practical idealism"; it also observed apologetically that "time has been too short for the correction of all the ills we received as a heritage from the last Democratic Administration." It proposed a conference on "the use of submarines and poison gas." Though the document was drafted by a new breed of Republican such as Ogden Mills from New York - who even recommended the adoption of an anti-Klan plank - rather than party stalwarts like Senator Henry Cabot Lodge from Massachusetts or Senator George Pepper from Pennsylvania, it remained conservative in its blandness. A substitute platform presented by Wisconsin progressives caught a moral tone the other failed to embody, but was defeated without a vote.

The convention formally ran from June 10 to 12. No questions arose over the choice of the presidential nominee. After the delegates tried unsuccessfully to prevail on Governor Frank Lowden of Illinois to run for the vice presidency — they actually nominated him but he declined — Charles G. Dawes won the nomination on the third ballot. He defeated Herbert Hoover, the choice of National Chairman Butler, by 682 votes to 234. Both candidates suffered from unpopularity with one major group of voters: Dawes with organized labor for his opposition to certain strikes, Hoover with wheat farmers for his role in price fixing during the war. Hoover lost because most convention leaders were more sensitive to the farm vote than that of labor, and because the president had not endorsed him. Dawes, a fiery brigadier general of World War I, now fifty-nine years old (seven years older than Coolidge), was well received by the convention and by Republicans generally. No doubt the establishment would have preferred a man of quieter disposition such as Senator Charles Curtis from Kansas, but Dawes's denunciation of the closed shop pleased them. Since Coolidge had not strongly supported any candidate, congressional leaders and party rebels agreed that "Hell'n Maria" Dawes, who had denounced "pinhead" politicians before a congressional investigating committee, was available and a strong candidate. His familiarity with the West, which would be the battleground of the campaign, gave needed strength to a ticket headed by a conservative easterner. German-Americans, who could be expected to support La Follette in large numbers, liked Dawes in particular for helping to solve postwar difficulties in Germany through his service on the Reparations Commission. He was billed as the active member of the ticket who would carry on the partisan campaign for Coolidge, much as Richard Nixon would do for the incumbent Dwight D. Eisenhower in 1956. In an episode also suggestive of Nixon's career, a scandal was raised against Dawes. A dozen years earlier his bank had briefly loaned a banker friend named Lorimer, who had been expelled from the United States Senate, over a million dollars for the purpose of satisfying a state banking law; eventually, Lorimer's bank failed, but in 1924 this issue did not resonate with the voters.

Democratic Party nomination

Democratic candidates:

Sizable Democratic gains during the 1922 Midterm elections suggested to many Democrats that the nadir they experienced immediately following the 1920 elections was ending, and that a popular candidate like William Gibbs McAdoo from California, who could draw the popular support of labor and Wilsonians, would stand an excellent chance of winning the coming presidential election. The Teapot Dome scandal added yet even more enthusiasm for party initially, though further disclosures revealed that the corrupt interests had been bipartisan; Edward Doheny for example, whose name had become synonymous with that of the Teapot Dome scandal, ranked highly in the Democratic party of California, contributing highly to party campaigns, served as chairman of the state party, and was even at one point advanced as a possible candidate for vice-president in 1920. The death of Warren Harding in August 1923 and the succession of Coolidge blunted the effects of the scandals upon the Republican party, including that of Teapot Dome, but up until and into the convention many Democrats believed that the Republicans would be turned out of the White House.

The immediate leading candidate of the Democratic party was William Gibbs McAdoo, now sixty years old, who was extremely popular with labor thanks to his wartime record as Director General of the railroads and was, as former President Wilson's son-in-law, also the favorite of the Wilsonians. However, in January 1924, unearthed evidence of his relationship with Doheny discomforted many of his supporters. After McAdoo had resigned from the Wilson Administration in 1918, Joseph Tumulty, Wilson's secretary, had warned him to avoid association with Doheny. However, in 1919, McAdoo took Doheny as a client for an unusually large initial fee of $100,000, in addition to an annual retainer. Not the least perplexing part of the deal involved a million dollar bonus for McAdoo if the Mexican government reach a satisfactory agreement with Washington on oil lands Doheny held south of the Texas border. The bonus was never paid and McAdoo insisted later that it was a casual figure of speech mentioned in jest. At the time, however, he had telegraphed the New York World that he would have received "an additional fee of $900,000 if my firm had succeeded in getting a satisfactory settlement," since the Doheny companies had "several hundred million dollars of property at stake, our services, had they been effective, would have been rightly compensated by the additional fee." In fact, the lawyer received only $50,000 more from Doheny. It was also charged that on matters of interest to his client, Republic Iron and Steel, from whom he received $150,000, McAdoo neglected the regular channels dictated by propriety and consulted directly with his own appointees in the capital to obtain a fat refund.

McAdoo's connection to Doheny appeared to seriously lessen his desirability as a presidential candidate. In February Colonel House urged him to withdraw from the race, as did Josephus Daniels, Thomas Bell Love, and two important contributors to the Democratic party, Bernard Baruch and Thomas Chadbourne. Some advisers hoped that McAdoo's chances would improve after a formal withdrawal. William Jennings Bryan, who never doubted McAdoo's honesty, thought that the Doheny affair had damaged the lawyer's chances "seriously, if not fatally." Senator Thomas Walsh, who earlier had called McAdoo the greatest Secretary of the Treasury since Alexander Hamilton, informed him with customary curtness: "You are no longer available as a candidate." Breckinridge Long, who would be McAdoo's floor manager at the June convention, wrote in his diary on February 13: "As it stands today we are beat." The New York Times, itself convinced that McAdoo had acted in bad taste and against the spirit of the law, reported the widespread opinion that McAdoo had "been eliminated as a formidable contender for Democratic nomination."

McAdoo was unpopular for reasons other than his close association with Doheny. Even in 1918, The Nation was saying that "his election to the White House would be an unqualified misfortune." McAdoo, the liberal journal then believed, had wanted to go to war with Mexico and Germany, and he was held responsible for segregating clerks in the Treasury Department. Walter Lippmann wrote in 1920 that McAdoo "is not fundamentally moved by the simple moralities," and that his "honest" liberalism catered only to popular feeling. Liberal critics, believing him a demagogue, gave as evidence his stand for quick payment of the veterans' bonus.

Much of the dissatisfaction with McAdoo on the part of reformers and urban Democrats sprang from his acceptance of the backing of the Ku Klux Klan. James Cox, the 1920 Democratic nominee, indignantly wrote that "there was not only tacit consent to the Klan's support, but it was apparent that he and his major supporters were conniving with the Klan." Friends insisted that McAdoo's silence on the matter hid a distaste that the political facts of life kept him from expressing, and especially after the Doheny scandal when he desperately needed support. Thomas Bell Love of Texas - though at one time of a contrary opinion - advised McAdoo not to issue even a mild disclaimer of the Klan. To Bernard Baruch and others, McAdoo explained as a disavowal of the Klan his remarks against prejudice at a 1923 college commencement. But McAdoo could not command the support of unsatisfied liberal spokesmen for The Nation and The New Republic, who favored the candidacy of the Republican Senator Robert La Follette. A further blow to McAdoo was the death on February 3, 1924, of Woodrow Wilson, who ironically had outlived his successor in the White House. Father-in-law to the candidate, Wilson might have given McAdoo a welcome endorsement now that the League of Nations had receded as an issue. William Dodd of the University of Chicago wrote to his father that Wilson had been "counting on" his daughter's being in the White House. The New York Times however reported a rumor that Wilson had written to Cox hoping he would again be a candidate in 1924.

McAdoo received support from the Ku Klux Klan and refused to answer questions on if he was a member of the organization. McAdoo's supporters later controlled the platform committee at the convention and voted against adding a condemnation of the KKK to the platform. He defeated Oscar Underwood, who opposed the KKK and Prohibition, in the Georgia primary and split the Alabama delegation. Henry Ford, who was seen as a threat to McAdoo, chose to not run for the nomination.

In their immediate effects the heated primary contests drew to McAdoo the financial support of the millionaires Thomas Chadbourne and Bernard Baruch (who was indebted to McAdoo for his appointment as head of the War Industries Board); and they strengthened the resolve of Governor Smith, ten years younger than McAdoo, to make a serious try for the nomination, which he had originally sought primarily to block McAdoo on the behalf of the eastern political bosses. The contests also hardened the antagonisms between the candidates, and cut deeper divisions within the electorate. In doing this, they undoubtedly retrieved lost ground for McAdoo and broadened his previously shrinking base of support, drawing to him rural, Klan, and dry elements awakened by the invigorated candidacy of Smith. Senator Kenneth McKellar from Tennessee wrote to his sister Nellie: "I see McAdoo carried Georgia by such an overwhelming majority that it is likely to reinstate him in the running." The Klan seemed to oppose every Democratic candidate except McAdoo. A Klan newspaper rejected Ford because he had given a Lincoln car to a Catholic archbishop; it flatly rejected Smith as a Catholic from "Jew York"; and it called Underwood the "Jew, jug, Jesuit candidate." The primaries therefore played their part in crystallizing the split within the party that would tear it apart at the forthcoming convention. Urban immigrants and McAdoo progressives had earlier joined to fight the Mellon tax plans in Congress, since both groups represented people of small means; deeper social animosities dissolved their alliance, and the urban-rural division rapidly supplanted all others. Frank Walsh, a progressive New York lawyer, wrote: "If his [Smith's] religion is a bar, of course it is all right with me to bust up the Democratic party on such an issue."

More directly, the contest between McAdoo and Smith thrust upon the Democratic national convention a dilemma of a kind no politician would wish to confront. To reject McAdoo and nominate Smith would solidify anti-Catholic feeling and rob the party of millions of otherwise certain votes in the South and elsewhere. But to reject Smith and nominate McAdoo would antagonize American Catholics, who constituted some 16 percent of the population and most of whom could normally be counted upon by the Democrats. Either selection would affect significantly the future of the party. Now in the ostensibly neutral hands of Cordell Hull, the Democratic national convention chairman, party machinery was expected to shift to the victor in the convention, and a respectable run in the fall election would ensure the victor's continued supremacy in Democratic politics.

The selection of New York as the site for the 1924 convention was based in part on the recent success of the party; in 1922 thirteen Republican congressmen from the state had lost their seats. New York City had not been chosen for a convention since 1868. Wealthy New Yorkers, who had outbid other cities, declared their purpose "to convince the rest of the country that the town was not the red-light menace generally conceived by the sticks." Though dry organizations opposed the choice of New York, it won McAdoo's grudging consent in the fall of 1923, before the oil scandals made Smith a serious threat to him. McAdoo's own adopted state, California, had played host to the Democrats in 1920.

The 1924 Democratic National Convention was held from June 24 to July 9, and while there were a number of memorable moments, none were more crucial to the following proceedings then what occurred after a Platform Committee report on whether to censure the Ku Klux Klan by name came out. McAdoo controlled three of the four convention committees, including this one, and the majority report declared specifically against naming the Klan - although all the Committee members agreed on a general condemnation of bigotry and intolerance. Every effort was made to avoid the necessity of a direct commitment on the issue. Smith did not want to inflame the issue, but the proponents of his candidacy were anxious to identify McAdoo closely with the Klan and possibly to defeat him in a test of strength before the balloting began; the Smith faction, led by George Brennan of Illinois, therefore demanded that the specific denunciation of the Klan uttered by the committee minority become official.

William Jennings Bryan, whose aim was to keep the party together and to maintain harmony among his rural followers, argued that naming the Klan would popularize it, as had the publicity given the organization by the New York World. It was also good politics to avoid the issue, Bryan claimed, since naming it would irredeemably divide the party. Worse still, Bryan believed, denouncing the Klan by name would betray the McAdoo forces, since it had been the Smith camp's strategy to raise the issue. In contrast to Bryan, former mayor Andrew Erwin of Athens, Georgia, spoke for the anti-Klan plank. In the ensuing vote, the Klan escaped censure by a hair's breadth; the vote itself foretold McAdoo's own defeat in the balloting.

Balloting for President began on June 30. McAdoo and Smith each evolved a strategy to build up his own total slowly. Smith's trick was to plant his extra votes for his opponent, so that McAdoo's strength might later appear to be waning; the Californian countered by holding back his full force, though he had been planning a strong early show. But by no sleight of hand could the convention have been swung around to either contestant. With the party split into two assertive parts, the rule requiring a two-thirds majority for nomination crippled the chances of both candidates by giving a veto each could - and did - use. McAdoo himself wanted to drop the two-thirds rule, but his Protestant supporters preferred to keep their veto over a Catholic candidate, and the South regarded the rule as a protection of its interests. At no point in the balloting did Smith receive more than a single vote from the South and scarcely more than 20 votes from the states west of the Mississippi; he never won more than 368 of the 729 votes needed for nomination, though even this performance was impressive for a Roman Catholic. McAdoo's strength fluctuated more widely, reaching its highest point of 528 on the seventieth ballot. Since both candidates occasionally received purely strategic aid, the nucleus of their support was probably even less. The remainder of the votes were divided among dark horses and favorite sons who had spun high hopes since the Doheny testimony; understandably, they hesitated to withdraw their own candidacies as long as the convention was so clearly divided.

As time passed, the maneuvers of the two factions took on the character of desperation. Daniel C. Roper even went to Franklin Roosevelt, reportedly to offer Smith second place on a McAdoo ticket. For their part, the Tammany men tried to prolong the convention until the hotel bills were beyond the means of the outlanders; the Smith backers also attempted to stampede the delegates by packing the galleries with noisy rooters. Senator James Phelan from California, among others, complained of "New York rowdyism." But the rudeness of Tammany, and particularly the booing accord to Bryan when he spoke to the convention, only steeled the resolution of the country delegates. McAdoo and Bryan both tried to reassemble the convention in another city, perhaps Washington, D.C. or St. Louis. As a last resort, McAdoo supporters introduced a motion to eliminate one candidate on each ballot until only five remained, but Smith delegates and those supporting favorite sons managed to defeat the McAdoo strategy. Smith countered by suggesting that all delegates be released from their pledges - to which McAdoo agreed on condition that the two-thirds rule be eliminated - although Smith fully expected that loyalty would prevent the disaffection of Indiana and Illinois votes, both controlled by political bosses friendly to him. Indeed, Senator David Walsh from Massachusetts expressed the sentiment that moved Smith backers: "We must continue to do all that we can to nominate Smith. If it should develop that he cannot be nominated, then McAdoo cannot have it either." For his part, McAdoo would angrily quit the convention and leave the country once he lost: but the sixty-first inconclusive round - when the convention set a record for length of balloting - was no time to admit defeat.

It had seemed for a time that the nomination could go to Samuel Ralston, an Indiana senator and popular former governor. Advanced by the indefatigable boss Thomas Taggart, Ralston's candidacy might look for some support from Bryan, who had written, "Ralston is the most promising of the compromise candidates." Ralston was also a favorite of the Klan and a second choice of many McAdoo men. In 1922 he had launched an attack on parochial schools that the Klan saw as an endorsement of its own views, and he won several normally Republican counties dominated by the Klan. Commenting on the Klan issue, Ralston said that it would create a bad precedent to denounce any organization by name in the platform. Much of Ralston's support came from the South and West - states like Oklahoma, Missouri, and Nevada, with their strong Klan elements. McAdoo himself, according to Claude Bowers, said: "I like the old Senator, like his simplicity, honesty, record"; and it was reported that he told Smith supporters he would withdraw only in favor of Ralston. As with John W. Davis, Ralston had few enemies, and his support from men as divergent as Bryan and Taggart cast him as a possible compromise candidate. He passed Davis, the almost consistent third choice of the convention, on the fifty-second ballot; but Taggart then discouraged the boom for the time being because the McAdoo and Smith phalanxes showed no signs of weakening. On July 8, the eighty-seventh ballot showed a total for Ralston of 93 votes, chiefly from Indiana and Missouri; before the day was over, the Ralston total had risen to almost two hundred, a larger tally than Davis had ever received. Most of these votes were drawn from McAdoo, to whom they later returned.

Numerous sources indicate that Taggart was not exaggerating when he later said: "We would have nominated Senator Ralston if he had not withdrawn his name at the last minute. It was a near certainty as anything in politics could be. We had pledges of enough delegates that would shift to Ralston on a certain ballot to have nominated him." Ralston himself had wavered on whether to make the race; despite the doctor's stern recommendation not to run and the illness of his wife and son, the Senator had told Taggart that he would be a candidate, albeit a reluctant one. But the 300-pound Ralston finally telegraphed his refusal to go on with it; sixty-six years old at the time of the convention, he would die the following year.

The nomination, stripped of all honor, finally went to Davis, a compromise candidate who won on the one hundred and third ballot after the withdrawal of Smith and McAdoo. Davis had never been a genuine dark horse candidate; he had almost always been third in the balloting, and by the end of the twenty-ninth round he was the betting favorite of New York gamblers. There had been a Davis movement at the 1920 San Francisco convention of considerable size; however, Charles Hamlin wrote in his diary, Davis "frankly said ... that he was not seeking [the nomination] and that if nominated he would accept only as a matter of public duty." For Vice-President, the Democrats nominated the able Charles W. Bryan, governor of Nebraska, brother of William Jennings Bryan, and for many years editor of The Commoner. Infamously loquacious, Bryan attacked the gas companies of Nebraska and had attempted controversial projects such as a municipal ice plant for Lincoln. In 1922 he had won the governorship by promising to lower taxes. Bryan received little more than the necessary two-thirds vote, and no attempt was made to make the choice unanimous; boos were sounding through the Garden. The incongruous teaming of the distinguished Wall Street lawyer and the radical from a prairie state provided not a balanced but a polarized ticket, and because the selection of Bryan was reputed to be a sop to the radicals, many delegates unfamiliar with Davis's actual record came to identify the lawyer with a conservatism in excess even of that considerable amount he did indeed represent.

In his acceptance speech Davis made the perfunctory statement that he would enforce the prohibition law, but his conservatism prejudiced him in favor of personal liberty and home rule and he was frequently denounced as a wet. The dry leader Wayne Wheeler complained of Davis's "constant repetition of wet catch phrases like 'personal liberty,' 'illegal search and seizure,' and 'home rule'." After the convention Davis tried to satisfy both factions of his party, but his support came principally from the same city elements that had backed Cox in 1920.

Progressive Party nomination

The movement for a significant new third party had its impetus in 1919 when John A. H. Hopkins, earlier a prominent member of the Rooseveltian Progressive Party, organized the Committee of 48 as a progressive political action group. The work of political mobilization begun by the committee was taken up in 1922 by a conference of progressives called by the railroad brotherhoods of Chicago, where La Follette established his position as head of the young movement. The majority of participants at a second meeting that December in Cleveland were trade union officials, the delegates including William Green of the United Mine Workers and Sidney Hillman of the Amalgamated Clothing Workers of America. A quarter of the delegates came from the Nonpartisan League, the Farmer-Labor Party, and Morris Hillquit's Socialist Party of America, while individual farmers and labor spokesmen comprised the remainder of the progressive conclave. The Forty-Eighters acted as a mediating force between the idealistic Socialists and the pragmatic labor men. Although majority sentiment for an independent party did not crystallize in Cleveland, the dream of a united new liberal party captured the loyalty of many delegates who subsequently turned away from the major parties in 1924.

Out of the Committee of Forty-Eight, some earlier organizations formed by La Follette, and the Chicago conventions grew the Conference for Progressive Political Action. La Follette had told reporters the previous summer that there would be no need for a third ticket unless both parties nominated reactionaries. Then came the Doheny scandals. As it seemed likely at the time that the scandals would eliminate Democratic frontrunner William Gibbs McAdoo, who was popular among railroad unions and other labor groups, the way was paved for the party which was launched at Cleveland in July 1924. Twelve hundred delegates and nine thousand spectators ratified the nomination of La Follette. The atmosphere was more sober than the one that had prevailed in 1912, where Theodore Roosevelt elicited much enthusiasm among the delegations. Farmers themselves were sparsely represented; they were too "broke" to come, according to Senator Lynn Frazier. Only one African-American sat in the audience and only one or two eastern intellectuals. Duly accredited delegates appeared for the Food Reform Society of America, the National Unity Committee, and the Davenport Iowa Ethical Society. Many students attended, one of the largest groups coming from Columbia University. Jacob Coxey was present as well as John J. Streeter. Radical labor leaders constituted the main body of the congregation. It was the dream of the Progressives that they might replace the Democrats, and thereby bring a clearer ideological alignment to American politics. The best way to do this, according to John Hopkins, would be to prevent either of the major parties from gaining a majority in the Electoral College and thus force the House of Representatives to choose the President.

As the Progressive candidate for president, La Follette became leader of the first formal prominent alliance in American political history between members of organized labor and farm groups, and of these with Socialists and independent radicals. Even the American Federation of Labor, although weakened by a precipitous decline in membership since the First World War, gave La Follette mild backing and so officially supported a presidential candidate for the first time. The Progressive vice-presidential candidate was Senator Burton K. Wheeler from Montana, only one of many Democrats who abandoned the chaos of their own party for La Follette's, and found there an idealism and dedication unparalleled within any of the other major political organizations of the 1920s. Wheeler explained his defection in his autobiography: "When the Democratic party goes to Wall Street for a candidate, I must refuse to go with it." The Senator added special strength to the ticket, for he had played a major role in bringing to justice Attorney General Harry Daugherty. Moreover, his selection made it plain that the Progressives would seek votes from both major parties.

Ill with pneumonia and absent from his Senate desk during most of the spring, sixty-eight-year-old La Follette still was a formidable contender. Drawing on a variety of discontents, he could injure the cause of either major party in sections it could ill afford to lose. The long appeal to the farmer in the party platform suggested his major target, but the candidate was addressing every American. In his acceptance speech La Follette urged that military spending be curtailed and soldiers' bonus paid. At the foundation of La Follette's program was an attack on monopolies, which he demanded should be "crushed." His Socialist supporters took this as an attack on the capitalistic system in general; to non-Socialists, including the Senator himself, who believed this encroached on personal liberty, it signified a revival of the policy of trust-busting. The Progressive candidate also called for government ownership of water power and gradual nationalization of the railroads. He also supported the nationalization of cigarette factories and other large industries, strongly supported increased taxation on the wealthy, and supported the right of collective bargaining for factory workers. William Foster, a major figure within the Communist Party, considered La Follette a hopeless reactionary who wanted to break up monopolies and return to an era of small businesses.

Results

This was the first presidential election in which all American Indians were recognized as citizens and allowed to vote.

The total vote increased 2,300,000 but, because of the great drawing power of the La Follette candidacy, both the Republican and Democratic totals were less. Largely because of the deep inroads made by La Follette in the Democratic vote, Davis polled 750,000 fewer votes than were cast for Cox in 1920. Coolidge polled 425,000 votes less than Harding had in 1920. Nonetheless, La Follette's appeal among liberal Democrats allowed Coolidge to achieve a 25.2 percent margin of victory over Davis in the popular vote (the second largest since 1824, and the largest in the last century). Davis's popular vote percentage of 28.8% remains the lowest of any Democratic presidential candidate (not counting John C. Breckinridge's run on a Southern Democratic ticket in 1860, when the vote was split with Stephen A. Douglas, the main Democratic candidate), albeit with several other candidates performing worse in the electoral college.

Both La Follette and Davis had criticized the Ku Klux Klan during the campaign, but Coolidge did not speak on the issue despite pleas from black groups. The New York Times stated that "Either Mr. Coolidge holds his peace for mistaken reasons of policy and politics or he tolerates the Klan". Charles G. Dawes criticized the KKK on August 23, but his comments were criticized by Representative Fiorello La Guardia who stated that "General Dawes praised the Klan with faint damn".

The "other" vote amounted to nearly five million, owing in largest part to the 4,832,614 votes cast for La Follette. This candidacy, like that of Roosevelt in 1912, altered the distribution of the vote throughout the country and particularly in eighteen states in the Middle and Far West. Unlike the Roosevelt vote of 1912, the La Follette vote included most of the Socialist strength.

The La Follette vote was distributed over the nation, and in every state, but its greatest strength lay in the East North Central and West North Central sections. However, La Follette carried no section, and he was second in only two sections, the Mountain and Pacific areas. In twelve states, the La Follette vote was greater than that cast for Davis. In one of these states, Wisconsin, La Follette defeated the Republican ticket also, thus winning one state in the electoral college. The "other" vote led the poll in 235 counties, and practically all of these (225) gave La Follette a plurality. Four counties, three in the South, recorded zero votes, as against seven in 1920 – this decrease reflecting the Indian Citizenship Act.

With most of the third-party vote united under La Follette's candidacy, the Prohibition Party dropped to less than a third of the popular vote percentage that it had earned four years prior. For all intents and purposes, this was the end of the Prohibitionists as a significant political force; having regularly earned at least a percentage point of the popular vote since 1884, they would struggle to earn even a tenth of that number in the decades ahead as Prohibition became increasingly unpopular and was eventually repealed in 1933, though the party nominally continues to exist and contest presidential elections to this day.

Davis won in 1,279 counties, which was 183 more than what Cox had received, and Coolidge failed to win in 377 counties that Harding had won in 1920. Coolidge's net vote totals in the twelve largest cities were less than Harding's with Coolidge only receiving 1,308,000 compared to Harding's 1,540,000.

The inroads of the La Follette candidacy upon the Democratic Party were in areas where Democratic county majorities had been infrequent in the Fourth Party System. At the same time, the inroads of La Follette's candidacy upon the Republican Party were in areas where in this national contest their candidate could afford to be second or third in the poll. Thus, Davis carried only the traditionally Democratic Solid South and Oklahoma; due to liberal Democrats voting for La Follette, Davis lost the popular vote to Coolidge by 25.2 percentage points. Only Warren Harding, who finished 26.2 points ahead of his nearest competitor in the previous election, did better in this category in competition between multiple candidates (incumbent James Monroe was the only candidate in 1820 and thus took every vote).

The combined vote for Davis and La Follette over the nation was exceeded by Coolidge by 2,500,000. Nevertheless, in thirteen states (four border and nine western), Coolidge received only a plurality. The Coolidge vote topped the poll, however, in thirty-five states, leaving the electoral vote for Davis in only twelve. All the states of the former Confederacy voted for Davis (plus Oklahoma), while all of the Union/postbellum states (except Wisconsin and Oklahoma) voted for Coolidge. It remains the last time anyone won the Presidency without carrying a single former Confederate state.

This was the last election in which Republicans won Massachusetts and Rhode Island until 1952. The Republicans did so well that they carried New York City, a feat they have not repeated since, and this was also the last election in which they carried Suffolk County, Massachusetts; Ramsey County, Minnesota; Costilla County, Colorado; Deer Lodge County, Montana; or the City of St. Louis, Missouri. Davis did not carry any counties in twenty of the forty-eight states, two fewer than Cox during the previous election, but nonetheless an ignominy approached since only by George McGovern in his landslide 1972 loss. Davis did not carry one county in any state bordering Canada or the Pacific. The election was the last time a Republican won the presidency without Florida, Oklahoma, and Tennessee. It's also the only presidential election in which modern day battlegrounds Florida and Wisconsin both voted against a victorious Republican.

Source (Popular Vote): 

Source (Electoral Vote):

Geography of results

Cartographic gallery

Results by state

Close states
Margin of victory less than 5% (30 electoral votes):
North Dakota, 2.52% (5,009 votes)
Kentucky, 2.96% (24,111 votes)
Maryland, 4.00% (14,342 votes)
Montana, 4.60% (8,015 votes)

Margin of victory between 5% and 10% (69 electoral votes):
West Virginia, 5.38% (31,403 votes)
Nevada, 5.48% (1,474 votes)
New Mexico, 5.50% (6,203 votes)
Oklahoma, 5.59% (29,556 votes)
Arizona, 5.79% (4,281 votes)
Missouri, 5.79% (75,733 votes)
Tennessee, 9.21% (27,655 votes)
Minnesota, 9.92% (81,567 votes)

Tipping point state:
Nebraska, 17.51% (81,296 votes) (tipping point state for a Coolidge victory)

Statistics
Counties with Highest Percent of Vote (Republican)
Johnson County, Tennessee 91.32%
Keweenaw County, Michigan 91.15%
Shannon County, South Dakota 88.89%
Leslie County, Kentucky 88.83%
Windsor County, Vermont 88.43%

Counties with Highest Percent of Vote (Democratic)
Edgefield County, South Carolina 100.00%
Marlboro County, South Carolina 100.00%
Kershaw County, South Carolina 99.86%
Horry County, South Carolina 99.70%
Marion County, South Carolina 99.68%

Counties with Highest Percent of Vote (Progressive)
Comal County, Texas 73.96%
Mercer County, North Dakota 71.38%
Shawano County, Wisconsin 70.69%
Hutchinson County, South Dakota 70.38%
Calumet County, Wisconsin 69.42%

Notes

See also
History of the United States (1918–1945)
Progressive Era
1924 United States Senate elections
1924 United States House of Representatives elections
Second inauguration of Calvin Coolidge

References

Further reading

 Burner, David. The Politics of Provincialism: The Democratic Party in Transition, 1918-1932 (1968)
 Chalmers, David. "The Ku Klux Klan in politics in the 1920's." Mississippi Quarterly 18.4 (1965): 234-247 online.
Craig, Douglas B. After Wilson: The Struggle for the Democratic Party, 1920-1934 (1993)
 Davies, Gareth, and Julian E. Zelizer, eds. America at the Ballot Box: Elections and Political History (2015) pp. 139–52.

 Goldberg, David J. "Unmasking the Ku Klux Klan: The northern movement against the KKK, 1920-1925." Journal of American Ethnic History (1996): 32-48 online.

 McVeigh, Rory. "Power Devaluation, the Ku Klux Klan, and the Democratic National Convention of 1924." Sociological Forum 16#1 (2001) abstract.

 Martinson, David L. "Coverage of La Follette Offers Insights for 1972 Campaign." Journalism Quarterly 52.3 (1975): 539–542.

 Prude, James C. "William Gibbs McAdoo and the Democratic National Convention of 1924." Journal of Southern History 38.4 (1972): 621-628 online.
 Ranson, Edward. The Role of Radio in the American Presidential Election of 1924: How a New Communications Technology Shapes the Political Process (Edwin Mellen Press; 2010) 165 pages. Looks at Coolidge as a radio personality, and how radio figured in the campaign, the national conventions, and the election result.
  Tucker, Garland S., III. The high tide of American conservatism: Davis, Coolidge, and the 1924 election (2010) online

Primary sources 
 Chester, Edward W  A guide to political platforms (1977) online
 Porter, Kirk H. and Donald Bruce Johnson, eds. National party platforms, 1840-1964 (1965) online 1840-1956

External links

1924 popular vote by counties
 Election of 1924 in Counting the Votes 

 
Presidency of Calvin Coolidge
Calvin Coolidge
1924 in American politics
November 1924 events